Bengali music comprises a long tradition of religious and secular song-writing over a period of almost a millennium. Composed with lyrics in the Bengali language, Bengali music spans a wide variety of styles.

The Bengal region of the Indian subcontinent is currently split between the Indian state of West Bengal and the country of Bangladesh. West Bengal is still referred to as Bengal in the rest of India.

History 

The earliest music in Bengal was influenced by Sanskrit chants, and evolved under the influence of Vaishnav poetry such as the 13th-century Gitagovindam by Jayadeva, whose work continues to be sung in many eastern Hindu temples. The Middle Ages saw a mixture of Hindu and Islamic trends when the musical tradition was formalized under the patronage of Sultan and Nawabs and the powerful landlords baro bhuiyans.

Much of the early canon is devotional, as in the Hindu devotional songs of Ramprasad Sen a bhakta who captures the Bengali ethos in his poetic, rustic, and ecstatic vision of the Hindu goddess of time and destruction in her motherly incarnation, Ma Kali. Another writer of the time was Vidyapati. Notable in this devotional poetry is an earthiness that does not distinguish between love in its carnal and devotional forms; some see connections between this and Tantra, which originated sometime in the middle of the first millennium CE.

Forms

Kotali Gharana 
Kotalipara in the Faridpur Zilla of East Bengal (presently Bangladesh) owes its origin to “Chandraburmankot” erected there, circa 315 AD, the remains of which are still extant. “Kot” stands for fort, “Ali” signifies “wall and area surrounding the fort”, and “para” means a settlement or “a neighbourhood”. 

KotaliPara had been a hotbed of intellectual excellence for ages, especially in music, art and scholarship. 

Sangeetacharya Tarapada Chakraborty (1909-1975), was the first Pan-Indian Khayaliya from Bengal and the pioneer of Kotali Gharana. He had a journey similar to Ustad Allauddin Khan’s, coming to Kolkata penniless from Kotalipara ( currently in Bangladesh ) to learn classical music. Kotali Gharana is built on aesthetics. The aesthetics of the raga, expression, lyrics and thoughts. Over the years, the present Kotali style took the shape in the hands of Pandit Manas Chakraborty, a combination of musical purity and eclecticism, the practice of deriving ideas, style, or taste from a broad and diverse range of sources. Vidushi Ruchira Panda, is the global face of Kotali Gharana today.

Bishnupur Gharana 

The Bishnupur Gharana is the sole Classical (Drupad) gharana of Bengal. It originated in Bishnupur, Bankura by the court musicians of the Malla Kings. Bahadur Khan of Delhi, a descendant of the Tansen, was the father of Bishnupur Gharana. Bahadur Khan was brought to Bishnupur by Malla King Raghunath Singha II.

Baul

The Bauls (meaning "divinely inspired insanity") are a group of mystic minstrels (Muslim Sufis and Hindu Baishnos) from the Bengal region, who sang primarily in the 17th and 18th centuries. They are thought to have been influenced greatly by the Hindu tantric sect of the Kartabhajas as well as by Muslim Sufi philosophers. Bauls traveled and sang in search of the internal ideal, Moner Manush (Man of the Heart or the inner being), and described "superfluous" differences between religions. Lalon Fakir, alternatively known as Lalon Shah, who lived in the 19th century in and around Kushtia, is considered to be the greatest of all bauls.

Ramprasadi

The Bengali devotional songs written and music composed by eighteenth century Bengali saint-poet Ramprasad Sen are called Ramprasadi. They are usually addressed to Hindu goddess Kali.

Lalon Geeti

The Bengali songs composed by Bengali saint, philosopher, and social reformer Lalon are called Lalon Geeti.

Rabindra Sangeet

The leading proponent of Bengali music is Rabindranath Tagore (known in Bengali as Robi Thakur and Gurudeb, the latter meaning "Respected Teacher" (in the Bengal of that time, the suffix 'deb' was an honorific, ascribed to people who enjoyed immense respect, but this title was primarily used by his students at Santiniketan, though many others did use the address/) Tagore was a prolific composer with around 2,230 songs to his credit. His songs are known as rabindrasangit ("Tagore Song"), which merges fluidly into his literature, most of which—poems or parts of novels, stories, or plays alike—were lyricised. Influenced by the thumri style of Hindustani music, they ran the entire gamut of human emotion, ranging from his early dirge-like Brahmo devotional hymns to quasi-erotic compositions. They emulated the tonal colour of classical ragas to varying extents. Some songs mimicked a given raga's melody and rhythm faithfully; others newly blended elements of different ragas. Yet about nine-tenths of his work was not bhanga gaan, the body of tunes revamped with "fresh value" from select Western, Hindustani, Bengali folk and other regional flavours "external" to Tagore's own ancestral culture. His music is an exemplary instance of 'kavya-geeti', a style of composition that later found widespread use in the music industries at Bombay and Calcutta.

In 1971, Amar Shonar Bangla became the national anthem of Bangladesh. It was written — ironically — to protest the 1905 Partition of Bengal along communal lines: cutting off the Muslim-majority East Bengal from Hindu-dominated West Bengal was to avert a regional bloodbath. Tagore saw the partition as a cunning plan to stop the independence movement, and he aimed to rekindle Bengali unity and tar communalism. Jana Gana Mana was written in shadhu-bhasha, a Sanskritised form of Bengali, and is the first of five stanzas of the Brahmo hymn Bharot Bhagyo Bidhata that Tagore composed. It was first sung in 1911 at a Calcutta session of the Indian National Congress and was adopted in 1950 by the Constituent Assembly of the Republic of India as its national anthem.

For Bengalis, the songs' appeal, stemming from the combination of emotive strength and beauty described as surpassing even Tagore's poetry, was such that the Modern Review observed that "[t]here is in Bengal no cultured home where Rabindranath's songs are not sung or at least attempted to be sung... Even illiterate villagers sing his songs". Tagore influenced sitar maestro Vilayat Khan and sarodiyas Buddhadev Dasgupta and Amjad Ali Khan.

Most of his musical poems are detailed in two series of books – the Gitabitan (that only has the texts of the poems) and the Swarabitan (that has the poems and their musical notation). However, there exist several poems of his that are set to music, and yet find no mention in either of the above. These are handed down from his students to their students and so on.

Some of the notable exponents of Rabindrasangeet are Shantideb Ghosh, Debabrata Biswas, Pankaj Kumar Mullick, Kalim Sharafi, Kanika Bandyopadhyay, Rajeshwari Datta, Malati Ghoshal, Nilima Sen, Suchitra Mitra, Aditi Mohsin, Rezwana Choudhury Bannya, Subinoy Roy, Chinmoy Chatterjee, Hemanta Mukhopadhyay, Dwijen Mukhopadhyay, Sagar Sen, Santosh Thakur, Purabi Mukhopadhyay, Kabir Suman, Banani Ghosh, Mita Haque, Indrani Sen, Srikanto Acharya, Shreya Guhathakurta Sahana Bajpaie Mohan Singh

Nazrul Geeti

Another influential body of work is that of Kazi Nazrul Islam, which constitutes what is known as Nazrul geeti. Some of the notable Nazrulgeeti singers from India include Suprova Sircar, Dhirendra Chandra Mitra, Manabendra Mukhopadhyay, Dr. Anjali Mukhopadhyay, Dhiren Bose, Adhir Bagchi, Purabi Dutta, Firoza Begum, Anup Ghoshal, and, Bangladeshi singer Sohrab Hossain.

Shyama Sangeet

Shyama Sangeet is a genre of Bengali devotional songs dedicated to the Hindu goddess Shyama or Kali which is a form of supreme universal mother-goddess Durga or parvati. It is also known as Shaktagiti or Durgastuti. Shyama Sangeet appeals to the common man because it is a musical representation of the relationship of eternal and sublime love and care between the mother and her child. It is free of the common rituals of worship and also the esoteric practice of the Tantra. A notable singer is Pannalal Bhattacharya.

Dwijendrageeti

Dwijendralal Ray's Dwijendrageeti (the Songs of Dwijendralal), which number over 500, create a separate subgenre of Bengali music. Two of Dwijendralal Ray's most famous compositions are Dhana Dhanya Pushpa Bhara and Banga Amar Janani Amar. Ray is regarded as one of the most important figures in early modern Bengali literature.

Atulprasadi

Atulprasadi, one of the major lyricist and composers of early-modern period, is also widely popular
in Paschimbanga.  Atul Prasad is credited with introducing the Thumri style in Bengali music. His songs centred on three broad subjects: patriotism, devotion and love.

Prabhat Samgiita

Prabhát Saḿgiita also known as Songs of a New Dawn and Prabhat Songs, are songs composed by Prabhat Ranjan Sarkar. Sarkar composed a total of 5,018 songs including the lyrics and the tune, in a period of eight years from 1982 until his death in 1990, making using of eight different languages: Bengali, Hindi, English, Sanskrit, Urdu, Magahi, Maithili and Angika.

Other

Bhatiali
Qwali
Bhawaiya
Dhamail
Gombhira
Kavigan, poems sung with simple music usually presented on stage as a musical battle between poets.
Jatra Pala, songs associated exclusively with plays (performed on-stage). Usually involves colourful presentations of historical themes.

Numerous other poets and composers had laid the foundation for the rich repertoire of Bengali music in the 19th century and early 20th century. Some stalwarts of this ear include Ramnidhi Gupta (commonly known as Nidhu Babu), Lalon Fakir, Atulprasad Sen, Dwijendralal Ray, Rajanikanta Sen and a large canon of patriotic songs from India's Independence movement.

Modern Bengali music
Modern Bengali music has been enriched by Indian singers like Jaganmoy Mitra (1918–2003) (who is considered a pioneer of modern song), as well as artists such as Hemanta Kumar Mukhopadhyay, Kishore Kumar, Manabendra Mukhopadhyay, Sandhya Mukhopadhyay, Manna Dey, Sachin Dev Burman, Rahul Dev Burman, Bhupen Hazarika, Lata Mangeshkar, Asha Bhonsle, Talat Mehmood, Aarti Mukherji, Kabir Suman, Amit Kumar, Shibaji Chatterjee, Kumar Sanu, Dhananjay Bhattacharya, Shyamal Mitra, Shreya Ghoshal, Arijit Singh, Mitali Mukherjee, Dwijen Mukhopadhyay, Manabendra Mukhopadhyay, Sachin Gupta, Subir Sen, Uma Bose, Kanan Devi, Utpala Sen, Alpana Banerjee, Sabita Chowdhury, and D. L.Roy Dilip Kumar Roy.

Tapan Chowdhury, Azam Khan, Abdul Jabbar, Ferdousi Rahman, Khurshid Alam, Bashir Ahmad, Syed Abdul Hadi, Shahnaz Rahmatullah, Kalim Sharafi, Abida Sultana, Kanak Chapa, Shakila Zafar, Samina Chowdhury, Kumar Biswajit, Arnob, Farida Parveen, Andrew Kishore, James, Ayub Bachchu, Mila, Anusheh Anadil, Sabina Yasmin, and Runa Laila all hailing from Bangladesh.

Krishna Chandra Dey and Pannalal Bhattacharya, were famous for their renditions of devotional songs, while Abbasuddin Ahmed, Kiran Chandra Roy, Amar Pal were stalwarts in singing Bengali folk music.

Bengali music is highly indebted to Lalon, Rabindranath Tagore, Kazi Nazrul Islam and Jasim Uddin.

All traditional Bengali music is based on classical music or on its variations. Some of the most reputed classical musicians of the sub-continent come from Bengal including Ustad Allauddin Khan, Tarapada Chakraborty, Pandit Jnan Prakash Ghosh (1909–1987), Pandit Ravi Shankar, Pandit Manas Chakraborty, Ustad Ayet Ali Khan and Ustad Abed Hossain Khan.

Notable Bengali music composers active in Calcutta (Kolkata) in the 1930s through the 1980s include Himangshu Dutta, Kamal Dasgupta, Rai Chand Boral, Pankaj Kumar Mullick, Anupam Ghatak, Sachin Dev Burman, Rahul Dev Burman Nachiketa Ghosh, Hemanta Kumar Mukhopadhyay, Salil Chowdhury, Sudhin Dasgupta, Shyamal Mitra, Kabir Suman, Nachiketa Chakraborty, Ajoy Das, and Bappi Lahiri, while Pranab Roy, Gouri Prasanna Majumdar, Kabir Suman and Pulak Bandyopadhyay were well-known lyricists. Jeet Ganguly is a modern music composer of Bengali film songs and Bollywood songs.

Nachiketa Chakraborty continues his established musical career for decades being a multi-dimensional singer, lyricist and composer with extraordinary class and caliber. An artist who has more than 450 released songs created and sung by him, more than 300 unreleased songs of his own, an artist who drives to develop his next generation. It is hard finding his parallel, probably impossible. The boss of Bengali Music revolution in the 90s, the educator honored as Banga Bhushan, who ignites the moral value in millions in the society, the philosopher who simplify life’s equations in simple language, the avenger who inspires common people to throw away an age-old rotten ruling system from Bengal.He is an idol for numerous people across the world and has inspired many renowned Bengali singers from time to time (Editor: Rajonyo Nandi).

Bengali rock

Bengali rock is a music genre in which the song lyrics are written in the Bengali language. It may refer to:
Rock music of Bangladesh 
Rock music of West Bengal

Western influence has resulted in the emergence of the phenomenon of Bengali bands, both in Dhaka and in Kolkata, as well as songs reflecting the joys and sorrows of the common man, Jibonmukhi Gaan (songs from life), which was inspired by Kabir Suman. Bengali bands became popular with young people in the 1970s, both in India and Bangladesh, and have since become entrenched in modern Bengali culture. Recently, traditional folk-based Bengali songs are also being released by bands.

Rock music of Bangladesh

Bangladeshi rock or Bangla rock originated in Chittagong with roots in 1960s and 1970s rock and roll. Bangladeshi rock music was influenced by the American and British rock and roll music. In the 1960s, blues rock was introduced by Zinga, The Windy Side of Care, The Lightnings, Rambling Stones etc. From early to mid 1970s pop rock music was introduced by Uchcharon, Souls, Feedback and Miles. In the 1980s number of subgenres such as hard rock and heavy metal was introduced. In the 1990s hard rock and heavy metal broke through the mainstream with bands like LRB, Feelings, Ark and Warfaze, Miles, Maqsood O' Dhaka, Souls etc. music of Bangladesh

Rock music of West Bengal

Rock music of West Bengal originated in Kolkata, West Bengal, India. The first rock band in West Bengal was Moheener Ghoraguli and also India's first rock band. In modern times, in this type of music distorted electric guitars, bass guitar, and drums are used, and sometimes accompanied with pianos and keyboards and in early times the instruments used in the modern times were also accompanied by saxophone, flute, violin and bass violin. Bhoomi a Bengali rock band formed in 1999 has also been using flute in their music.

Famous bands
Bangladesh
Some famous Bangladeshi bands are Nova, Uccharon, Spondan, Souls, Obscure, Different Touch, Feedback, Ark, Miles, LRB, Warfaze, Joler Gaan, Dalchhut, Avash, Shironamhin, Nagar Baul.

India
Bands like Moheener Ghoraguli, Bhoomi, Chandrabindoo, Fossils, Cactus, Lakkhichhara, Krosswindz, Kalpurush(), Prithibi,  etc.

English bands from Kolkata include Cassini's Division, Bolepur Bluez, Insomnia, Underground Authority, Pseudonym, Chronic Xorn, are also notable. Singers like Ajoy Chakraborty and Kaushiki Chakraborty are working to bring back classical raga influence into Bengali music.

Bengali bands use a wide variety of styles such as rock, pop, folk, and fusion. Their music is influenced both by popular American music as well as traditional Bengali folk music such as Bhatiali, Bhawaiya, Shyama Sangeet and Baul.

Bangladeshi hip hop

Bangladeshi hip hop is a genre of music and culture that covers a variety of styles of hip hop music developed in Bangladesh. Bangladeshi hip hop is heavily influenced by US hip hop, and started in early 2000.

Notes

Works cited
 

 
Bengal
 
Bangladeshi music
Culture of West Bengal